Isabella del Carmen Amado Medrano (born ) is a Panamanian artistic gymnast.

She competed at the 2014 World Artistic Gymnastics Championships in Nanning, China, 2015 Pan American Games in Toronto, and represented Panama at the 2016 Summer Olympics.

References

External links
https://thegymter.net/isabella-amado/
https://database.fig-gymnastics.com/public/gymnasts/biography/16672/true?backUrl=
http://www.the-sports.org/isabella-amado-medrano-gymnastics-spf362130.html
http://remezcla.com/features/sports/peru-panama-gymnastics-roommates/
http://www.gettyimages.com/pictures/isabella-amado-medrano--gymnast-14824407#isabella-amado-of-panama-competes-on-the-balance-beam-during-womens-picture-id586900366

1996 births
Living people
Panamanian female artistic gymnasts
Place of birth missing (living people)
Gymnasts at the 2015 Pan American Games
Pan American Games competitors for Panama
Gymnasts at the 2016 Summer Olympics
Olympic gymnasts of Panama
Central American Games gold medalists for Panama
Central American Games bronze medalists for Panama
Central American Games medalists in gymnastics